Charles Frederick Tickner (born November 13, 1953 in Lafayette, California) is an American figure skater.

Tickner won the gold medal at the 1978 World Figure Skating Championships, skating to music from Georges Bizet's Carmen and Jules Massenet's Le Cid (opera) for his long program. He also won the bronze medal at the 1980 Winter Olympics and the 1980 World Championships.

He is married and has three sons, and he currently resides in the East Bay, California. He is now a private Figure Skating coach.

Results

References

Navigation

1953 births
American male single skaters
Figure skaters at the 1980 Winter Olympics
Olympic bronze medalists for the United States in figure skating
Living people
Olympic medalists in figure skating
World Figure Skating Championships medalists
Medalists at the 1980 Winter Olympics